Baron Bruntisfield, of Boroughmuir in the City of Edinburgh, is a title in the Peerage of the United Kingdom. It was created in 1942 for the Scottish Conservative politician and former Vice-Chamberlain of the Household, Sir Victor Warrender, 8th Baronet. The Warrender family descends from George Warrender. He was Lord Provost of Edinburgh and represented Edinburgh in Parliament. In 1715 he was created a baronet, of Lochend in the County of Haddington, in the Baronetage of Great Britain. His grandson, the third Baronet, fought at the Battle of Minden in 1759, represented Haddington Burghs in the House of Commons and served as King’s Remembrancer of the Court of Exchequer from 1771 to 1791. He was succeeded by his son, the fourth Baronet. He sat as a Member of Parliament for Haddington Burghs, Truro, Sandwich, Westbury and Honiton and notably served as a Lord of the Admiralty from 1812 to 1812. In 1822 Warrender was admitted to the Privy Council. On his death the title passed to his younger brother, the fifth Baronet. His grandson, the seventh Baronet, was a Vice Admiral in the Royal Navy. He was succeeded by his son, the eighth Baronet, who was raised to the peerage as Baron Bruntisfield, of Boroughmuir in the City of Edinburgh, in 1942.  the titles are held by the latter's grandson, the third Baron, who succeeded in 2007. He is a retired officer in the British Army and investment banker.

Warrender baronets, of Lochend (1715)

Sir George Warrender, 1st Baronet (–1721)
Sir John Warrender, 2nd Baronet (c. 1686–1772)
Sir Patrick Warrender, 3rd Baronet (1731–1799)
Sir George Warrender, 4th Baronet (1782–1849)
Sir John Warrender, 5th Baronet (1786–1867)
Sir George Warrender, 6th Baronet (1825–1901)
Sir George John Scott Warrender, 7th Baronet (1860–1917)
Sir Victor Alexander George Anthony Warrender, 8th Baronet (1899–1993) (created Baron Bruntisfield in 1942)

Barons Bruntisfield (1942)
Victor Alexander George Anthony Warrender, 1st Baron Bruntisfield (1899–1993)
John Robert Warrender, 2nd Baron Bruntisfield (1921–2007)
Michael John George Warrender, 3rd Baron Bruntisfield (born 1949)

The heir apparent is the present holder's son John Michael Patrick Caspar Warrender (born 1996)

References

Kidd, Charles, Williamson, David (editors). Debrett's Peerage and Baronetage (1990 edition). New York: St Martin's Press, 1990.

Baronies in the Peerage of the United Kingdom
Noble titles created in 1942
Noble titles created for UK MPs
1715 establishments in Great Britain
1942 establishments in the United Kingdom